The Reserve Division of Baoji() was a short-lived reserve infantry formation of the People's Liberation Army active between 1984 and 1985.

The division was activated in September 1984 in Baoji, Shaanxi. By then the division was then composed of:
1st Regiment - Fengxiang
2nd Regiment
3rd Regiment - Fufeng
Artillery Regiment - Baoji County

The division failed to be acknowledged by the Central Military Commission and was likely dissolved in 1985.

References

Reserve divisions of the People's Liberation Army
Military units and formations established in 1984